Sandip Soparrkar (born 6 October 1964) is an Indian Latin and ballroom dancer, Bollywood choreographer, actor, columnist, Dance Reality Show judge, Radio Jockey and a Ted X speaker, who holds a doctorate in World Mythology Folklore from Pacifica Graduate Institute United States and also an Honorary Doctorate in Performing arts from The National American University. He has been honoured with 3 National Excellence Awards and 1 National Achievement Award by the Government of India, he is also the recipient of the Rabindranath Tagore Literary Prize for Social Achievement. and the prestigious Bharat Gaurav Samaan given by the Ministry of Culture at The House of Lords, London, UK. The renowned 'Dance Today' Magazine, USA, rates Sandip as one of the '100 most influential dancers in the world'.

He founded "India Dance Week", which combines Indian and international dance. He has also become a philanthropist with this Worldwide  initiative "Dance for a Cause" where he uses dance, drama and music as a medium to raise awareness of various social issues in the society. At the British House of Commons, World Book of Records / Indo-British Cultural forum honored Soparrkar with the title of "Ballroom Dance Jewel". He is the only dancer choreographer of India who has a postage stamp issued by the Bhutan Government with his picture and with the logo of his worldwide initiative 'Dance for a Cause'. and the first dancer choreographer to receive the Rabindranath Tagore Social Achievement Prize for is much appreciated 'Dance for a Cause' initiative.

Apart from that he is the only Indian dancer and choreographer who has the honour of having two miniature dancing replica dolls of his by India Fine Arts Council (IFAC) and My Cute Mini for his extraordinary work in the field of dance and social work.

He is the Chairperson of India Fine Art Council (IFAC) and extensively promotes artists from all fields. He has been bestowed with the title of ‘The World Peace Ambassador’ by The World Peacekeepers Movement. He is the first Indian to be certified by the Ballroom Dance Training School, Bonn, Germany and has been honoured with the National Achievement Award and with three National Excellence Awards by the Government of India. He is also a recipient of the Prestigious Shakti Samman in a form of a Sword by the Ministry of Culture, Government of India.

The government of the United States along with Lions Club International honoured Sandip with the 'Visionary Award' for developing a Ballroom dance program for the blind. He is the first Indian Dance choreographer who was invited to the United Nations Headquarters in New York city to conduct a dance session for the United Nations Staff through the United Nations Staff Recreation Council (UNSRC) and Society for Promotion of Indian Culture and Experience (SPICE). He has also been honoured twice by Mr. Thomas Lankey, honourable Mayor of Edison, New Jersey, United States of America with a Proclamation citation regarding his initiative 'Dance for a Cause', Highest State honour was given to Sandip by The State of New Jersey, USA in form of an 'Assembly Resolution' by New Jersey General Assembly, USA.

In the history of any Bollywood film magazine Soparrkar is the first dancer Choreographer to grace a cover of a Bollywood Magazine – Films Today

Worldwide popularity of Soparrkar grew manifolds when international luxury watch brand Rolex appointed him as their 'Indian Youth Icon' and gifted him with their timeless masterpiece. he is also the brand ambassador for Solitario Diamonds 

His debut film as an actor 'I Am Not a Pornstar Nazar Sambhal Ke - Mind you Gaze' sensational poster was released at the prestigious World Film Festival in Los Angeles, USA amidst Hollywood icons

Queen Elizabeth II and Prince Charles have written personal letters of appreciation to Sandip Soparrkar for promoting ballroom and Latin dance culture in India. He was the first Indian to be invited to judge the Asian Latin & Ballroom Dance Championship held at Colombo where 32 countries took part with 78 competitive dances. He is the first Indian who was invited to be on the jury of Sharm Shaikh International theatre festival for the youth, Egypt, along with other top theatre personalities from all over the world Soparrkar is a noted contributor to The Asian Age and Afternoon Voice newspapers.

His Radio Show in India on Radio Nasha, Radio One and Fever FM titled 'Aao Twist Karein with RJ Sandip Soparrkar' received the World Book of Records (WBR) London, UK certification as the world's first radio dance show. Apart from that he is also Nominated as the 'Goodwill Ambassador' for World Book of Records USA.
     
Soparrkar is also one of the Board of Directors of the prestigious International Business School Washington (IBSW) which has its branches in The United States of America, France and India.

He is the founder member of Mumba India International Film Festival

Early life and training
Sandip was born in Bhopal, second of the two children to Col Ajay Kumar and Rani Soparkar. He is half Gujarati and half South Indian.

He comes from a very illustrious family background, his great-grandfather Dr MB Soparkar was the personal doctor to Mahatma Gandhi, Vallabhbhai Patel and Morarji Desai. Renowned actress Vyjayanthimala is his maternal aunt and the legendary dancer Sonal Mansingh fondly addresses him, as  her 'Dancing Son'.

He started his career as a hotel management graduate. He completed his specialization in world cuisine and started working as a cook. At the same time, he started learning Latin and ballroom dances. When he choreographed for Zubeidaa in 2001, he decided to take up dancing as his career option. In 2007, he was unmarried and yet adopted a child named Arjun. making him the first single man in India to adopt. In 2021 he went on to adopt a differently-abled (hearing and speech impaired) boy Kabir 

He married Indian super model and actress Jesse Randhawa in 2009 but they separated in 2016.

Career

His first film Zubaidaa won him acclaims post which he went on to choreograph many Bollywood films and later started to promote Indian cinema all over the world with his talk and dance sessions at various international film festivals. In 2014, Soparrkar along with his wife Jesse Randhawa represented India at the Cannes Film Festival in France. The duo also performed at the International Marathi Film Festival Award (IMFFA) held in Hong Kong. As "The Indian Ambassador of Dance" Sandip also represented India's dance community at the Madrid International Film Festival, the St Tropez International Film Festival, the Berlin International Film Festival, the Nice International Film Festival, the Global Film Festival, and the World Film Festival.

In 2015, Soparrkar starred alongside Bollywood actors Raveena Tandon and Tiger Shroff in "India Dance Week". The later editions of it attracted guests such as Govinda, Helen and Bappi Lahiri.

Soparrkar was named the cause ambassador for adoption in India by Catalyst of Social Action (CSA). He is also the brand ambassador for the Rubik's Cube sport in India and face of American NGO "Miracle Foundation" which helps Indian orphanages. Due to his interest in singing, the Karaoke World Championship made Soparrkar an ambassador for this as well.

Magazines featuring Soparrkar on the cover include B'Youtiful, among others.

Colombian singer Shakira, American singers Madonna, Beyoncé Knowles and Britney Spears, and soccer player Diego Madarona have all taken dance instruction from Soparrkar. Bollywood actors Hrithik Roshan, Ameesha Patel, Dino Morea, Kajol, Tabu, Manisha Koirala, Sonam Kapoor, Neha Dhupai, Priyanka Chopra and Richa Tembhurne have also been his students.

Sandip featured on the cover of the Bollywood magazine 'Films Today' in its July 2018 cover the cover was shot at New Jersey Gardens in USA and was designed by Indian fashion designer Chhaya Gandhi.

Controversies
As Soparrkar was the brand ambassador for adoptions in India, as well as the first single man in India to adopt, it is believed that he inspired his student Madonna to adopt an Indian baby.

After Soparrkar choreographed Britney Spears's hit single Womanizer in 2008 international media went into a frizzy talking about their affair which lasted just for few weeks

He drew criticism when he declined to perform at the wedding of Prince William and Kate Middleton at Buckingham Palace in 2009.

He was surrounded with people burning his posters during a show for designer Rohit Verma. The creative dancer choreographer mixed live Bihu music and song and danced the traditional Brazilian Samba to it. Little did he realise that this fusion dance which he created did not go down well with a few cultural organisations in Assam. There were people on the streets asking for an apology from the organisers and the choreographer for hurting and insulting Assamese culture with such a fusion. The local people ripped the Samba- Bihu Fusion apart calling it Bollywood dance and saying it was disrespectful to the North East Indian culture. The controversy and anger of people grew even more when Sandip Soparrkar refused to give an apology for what he had created. Sandip Soparrkar said “My dance was a blend of authentic Bihu Music and traditional Samba dance, I did not change the bihu music to fit samba dance nor did I change samba dance to fit into bihu music, they both were used in its pure form, they just blended in so well, it was not a bollywood dance at all like some people are saying.”

He also acted in a film titled 'I Am Not A Pornstar Nazar Sambhaal Ke - Mind Your Gaze'.

He showed his displeasure and urged the Information and Broadcasting ministry of his country to explain why choreographers were not included in the Indian delegates list at the country of honor celebration at the Cannes Film Festival 2022

Humanitarian Work

When Soparrkar became the first single man to adopt in India he was chosen as the 'Cause Ambassador' of Catalyst for Social Action (CSA) an organisation that helps orphans and orphanages in India. He actively promotes the cause of Adoptions all over the world.

He was also chosen as the face of US based NGO The Miracle Foundation, an organisation that seeks to empower orphan kids and raise them in a family-style orphanage with personal attention

In 2008 he in association with Mrs. Parmenshwar Godrej launched 'Dance for a Cause' at the World Economic Forum in Davos, Switzerland highlighting the Global cause by People for the Ethical Treatment of Animals (PETA) of 'Save the Tiger'. Since then Soparrkar has brought light to various other causes such as AIDS, Organ Donation, Cancer Care, Acid Attack, Drug Abuse, Domestic Violence, Care for the elderly and many more. He has been honoured with the National Excellence award in 2017 by the Government of India. and also the Government of Bhutan issued a postage stamp honouring his worldwide initiative.  
 
He is also on the advisory board with Confluence India, an organisation that unifies skills, talents and leadership globally.

He adopted 2000 young girls India in association with NGO Lets All Help and M/s Wonderize and took the initiative to take care of the personal hygiene by distributing free sanitary pads and educating the girls in regards to menstruation hygiene and also propagating that 'No one sleeps hungry or be void of basic personal hygiene.'.

He is also the honorary board member of World Human rights Organization (WHRO) and a goodwill ambassador of World Book of Records.

Notable performances
 2008 - Pop icon Madonna's 50th Birthday Celebration 
 2009 - Dance at Katy Perry and Russell Brands wedding
 2009 - 'Save the Snake' as PETA brand ambassador
 2011 - 'Save the Tiger' Themed dance at the ‘World Economic Forum’, Davos, Switzerland in presence of USA President Bill Clinton and French President Nicolas Sarkozy
 2013 - ‘When Gods Meet’ Indo – Greek Mythology based show with Padma Vibhushan Padma Bhushan Dr Sonal Mansingh
 2015 - ‘Enchanted Love’ and Indo Korean love saga of 78 AD for Prime Minister of South Korea Mr. Lee Wan-Koo
 2016 - ‘Save the Peacock’ for Mumbai International Film Festival (MIFF)
 2016 - Born to Love - Greek Mythological story based on life of Cupid 
 2017 - Stop Acid Attack  
 2018 - Say no to Drugs 
 2019 - Namami Gange - A mythological show with Bollywood iconic actress Hema Malini where she played the role of the river Ganga and Soparrkar was Lord Shiva

Television appearances

 2005 - Dance Divas - on Zoom TV 
 2006 - Stunner 10 - on Bindass TV
 2007 - India's top Dancer - Zoom TV 
 2008 -  Chak De - Shehar Di Kudiyan Te Galli De Gunde - on Channel 9x
 2009 - Boogie Woogie - India's best Latin dance couple hunt.    
  2010 – He judged 'Dance India Dance L'il Masters Season 1 with Farah Khan on Zee TV
 2013 - He was jury of Jhalak Dikhhla Jaa UAE Season 2 along with Bollywood veteran choreographer Saroj Khan for Color TV
 2013 - He judged 'Bharat Ki Shaan - Rum Jhum' along with Indian Classical dance legend Padma Vibhushan Dr. Sonal Mansingh for Doordarshan
  2014 – He was judge of a dance reality show 'Closeup Bharat Ki Shaan - Let's Dance' on DD National
  2014 – He also judged 'Jhalak Dikhhla Jaa UAE Dance Extravaganza 2014' season 3 for Color TV
 2015 - He along with his wife Super Model Jesse Randhawa was seen on Sony Television Show 'Power Couple'
 2015 - He judged UAE 'Jhalak Dikhhla Jaa' season 4 with renowned Bollywood choreographer Geeta Kapoor for Color TV 
 2016 - He was again seen on UAE television along with choreographer Pony Verma for 'Jhalak Dikhhla Jaa' season 5 for Color TV
 2016 - Comedy Nights Live
 2017 - Jhalak Dikhlajaa UAE and South Africa season 6. 
 2018 - Dance Muqabala - TV Asia USA and Canada

Filmography
As a film choreographer
  2001 - Zubeidaa
  2004 - Kyun! Ho Gaya Na...
  2005 - Mangal Pandey: The Rising
2005 - The Myth (film) starring Jackie Chan and Mallika Sherawat
 2007 - Aakashgopuram (Malayalam Film) 
 2008 - Britney Spears Video - Womaniser
 2008 - Hollywood Film - Nine by Director of Chicago Rob Marshall
 2009 - Phir Kabhi
  2010 - Kites
  2011 - 7 Khoon Maaf Song Daarling and Tango 
 2012 - Rush
 2012 - Ghost
 2014 - Holiday: A Soldier Is Never Off Duty
 2016 - JD
 2017 - Love Life Screwups (web series)

As a film actor 
 2008 - Hollywood Film - Nine (as an actor and a choreographer) by Director of Chicago Rob Marshall
 2012 - Ghost (as a special appearance in the title track)

As a theater actor
 2013 - When Gods Meet (Indo Greek dance drama)
 2015 - Enchanted Love (Indo Korean love story)
 2015 - Hyacinth (Musical on LGBT issue)
 2016 - Born to Love (Love story of Cupid) 
 2017 - Jannat Central
 2018 - Sairandhari - The Musical

Nominations
 2010 - He was nominated for song 'Womanizer' from Britney Spears Album 'Circus' for the American Choreography Awards
 2011 - He was nominated for song 'Fire' from the film 'Kites' at the Screen Awards 
  2012 – He was nominated for "Daarling" from the film "7 Khoon Maaf" at the Screen Awards
 2013 - Nominated as the ‘Most Stylish Couples on Red Carpet’ by the Cannes Film Festival

Awards and recognitions
  2014 – Honoured with the National Achievement Award by The Government of India for his work in the field of choreography and dance
  2014 – 'The Kudos Dance Award' 2014 honoured him with 'India's Best Choreographer' Award
  2015 – He was honoured with Jewel of Maharashtra award by the alumni of MSIHMCT (Maharashtra State Institute of Hotel Management and Catering Technology)
  2015 – He was honoured with "Aaj ki Delhi Achievement Award" for his contribution in the Hindi film Industry
  2015 – He was honoured and awarded by Navi Mumbai International Film Festival (NMIFF) for his outstanding contribution in the field of dance
 2015 - ‘Most Inspirational Choreographer of the year 2015’ by Indian Film and Television Choreographers Association 
 2016 - ‘National Excellence Award’ by The Government of India
 2016 - ‘Visionary Award’ by the Lions Club USA and Government of United States of America for Developing a Ballroom Dance Program for the blind
 2016 - ‘Choreographer of the Year’ by People Choice Hum Log Award
 2016 - ‘Choreographer with a Heart’ by NBC Newsmakers Achievers Award
 2016 - ‘Dream Achiever’ Awarded by Film Today
 2016 - ‘Bharat Icon Award’ for best choreographer, by Ministry of India, Government of India
 2016 - ‘The Humanity Excellence Award’ by We Welfare Society for raising fund and helping various charities in India and abroad
 2016 - 'Global face of Dance' by Global Film Festival
 2016 - ‘WOW Personality Award 2016’ for being internationally renowned dance choreographer par excellence
 2017 - 'Ballroom Dance Jewel Award' by the World Book of Records and Indo-British Intellectuals Forum UK
 2017 - 'Gaurav Samaan' - for his initiative "Dance for a Cause"
 2017 - 'Quality Mark Award' - for imparting authentic and pure knowledge of Latin and Ballroom Dancing
 2017 - 'Golden Achiever Award' - for his outstanding achievement in the field of dance
 2017 - 'Shakti Samman' - an honour awarded by the Indian Ministry of Culture, which includes a traditional Indian sword
 2017 - 'National Excellence Award' by The Government of India, for his social initiative 'Dance for a Cause'
 2017 - Proclamation Citation from Mayor of Edison, New Jersey, USA
 2018 - Asia's Most Trusted Brand by International Brand Consulting Corp, USA
 2018 – Postage Stamp by the Government of Bhutan
 2019 – Assembly Resolution by New Jersey General Assembly, USA
 2020 - Rabindranath Tagore Social Achievement Prize, by Rabindranath Tagore Literary Prize, Copenhagen, Denmark
2020 - Corona Yodha - By Governor of Maharashtra Shri Bhagat Singh Koshyari
2021 - APJ Abdul Kalam Bharat Puraskar
He received Newsmakers Achievers Awards in 2021.
2022 - Bharat Gaurav Samaan at The House of Lords, London, UK

References

External links
 

Living people
Indian male dancers
Indian film choreographers
Indian choreographers
1964 births